Robert Thompson (November 25, 1927 – June 1, 1999) was a member of the Wisconsin State Assembly.

Biography
Thompson was born in Madison, Wisconsin. He graduated from Poynette High School in Poynette, Wisconsin. Later, he joined the United States Marshals Service. As a U.S. marshal, Thompson was in charge of law enforcement at Fort McCoy, Wisconsin in 1980, when it was used as an internment camp for Cuban refugees admitted as part of the Mariel boatlift.

Thompson was married with one child. He died on June 1, 1999 after suffering a heart attack while watching a softball game.

Political career
Thompson was first elected to the Assembly in 1970 as a Democrat. After serving as Sergeant at Arms of the Wisconsin State Senate from 1975 to 1978, Thompson was again elected to the Assembly in 1982. Additionally, he became Chairman of Dekorra, Wisconsin in 1981 and a member of the Columbia County, Wisconsin Board in 1982. In 1990, Thompson ran for Secretary of State of Wisconsin as a Republican, losing to incumbent Doug La Follette.

References

Politicians from Madison, Wisconsin
People from Columbia County, Wisconsin
Members of the Wisconsin State Assembly
Wisconsin Republicans
Wisconsin Democrats
United States Marshals
1927 births
1999 deaths
20th-century American politicians